Stanisław Tondos (10 March 1854 – 22 December 1917) was a Polish landscape painter and architectural painter.

Life 

He studied during the years 1869–1875 at the Jan Matejko Academy of Fine Arts with Jan Matejko and Władysław Łuszczkiewicz, among others, and continued his education in Vienna and Munich. He mainly painted watercolors depicting cityscapes (Veduta). He also used oil and pastel techniques. He most often depicted Kraków. He also painted Warsaw, Poznań and Lviv. He went to work in Venice, Vienna, Nuremberg and Magdeburg. His works today have documentary value, because they illustrate the appearance of no-longer existing buildings and entire architectural ensembles. They also served the restorers in the restoration of historical monuments and buildings in Kraków. His works can currently be seen on the Wawel among others.

Tondos was a supporter of propagating art using postcards. In 1886, in cooperation with Juliusz Kossak, he published a graphic portfolio titled Klejnoty m. Krakowa (Jewels of the city of Kraków), containing reproductions of 24 watercolors. Later, with Wojciech Kossak, he published subsequent cycles of watercolors. He received gold medals at postcard exhibitions in Warsaw and Paris in 1900.

Gallery

References 

1854 births
1917 deaths
Artists from Kraków
Polish landscape painters